The 2018–19 1. FC Union Berlin season is the 53rd season in the football club's history and 9th consecutive season in the second division of German football, the 2. Bundesliga and 13th overall. In addition to the domestic league, 1. FC Union Berlin also are participating in this season's edition of the domestic cup, the DFB-Pokal. This is the 53rd season for 1. FC Union Berlin in the Stadion An der Alten Försterei, located in Köpenick, Berlin, Germany. The season covers a period from 1 July 2018 to 30 June 2019.

Season review

Pre-season
After a disappointing season in which Union was only able to avoid relegation on the 33rd matchday, the team started into the season with a brand new look. Starting at the front with a new manager Urs Fischer, who has won numerous titles in the Swiss Super League with FC Basel; this was only the beginning of a new Union squad that saw drastic changes from the season before. Union would start the new campaign without fan favorite Steven Skrzybski but added key players such as Rafal Gikiewicz and Sebastian Andersson, both of whom would go on to feature in every fixture.

2. Bundesliga first half (matchday 1–17)
Union Berlin started their 13th ever 2. Bundesliga season with a 1–0 win at home to start the campaign, courtesy of a late free kick goal by former captain Felix Kroos. A 1–1 draw the next week against 1. FC Köln in Cologne, was already a reason for optimism for the Köpenick based club, as Köln were predicted by many to promote back into the Bundesliga. This draw would be followed up with many similar score lines, as Union managed a staggering 10 draws in just the first half of the season, along with 7 wins. Two key fixtures were a matchday nine 1–1 draw against 1. FC Heidenheim where goalkeeper Gikiewicz saved Union with a headed goal from a corner kick in the 94th minute. The second a 2–2 away draw against Hamburger SV, who after relegating for the first time in their history the season before, were favorites to go back up. During that first half of the season, Union was also drawn against Borussia Dortmund in the 2nd round of the DFB Pokal after 90 minutes, coming close to beating the Bundesliga club and creating a massive upset in Dortmund. Only to be stymied by a Marco Reus penalty kick goal in the final moments of the game. This impressive early-season run had Die Eisernen remaining undefeated in their first 17 games in 3rd place, within striking distance of promotion heading into the winter break to the surprise of many.

2. Bundesliga second half (matchday 18–34)
In the first matchday of the 2nd half of the season, Union fans were met with a worrying result, losing the first game back in a 0–3 collapse to midtable Erzgebirge Aue. However, things quickly got back up on track with a win against eventual champions Köln in Berlin 2–0. Union maintained their incredible results while playing at home the rest of the campaign, only losing one game out of their 17 at home all season against SC Paderborn, who had emerged as a promotion candidate as well. On matchday 31 a 2–0 win against Hamburger SV in the near-impenetrable fortress that was the Stadion An der Alten Försterei launched Die Eisernen back into the top three, good enough for a playoff against the 16th place Bundesliga team for a chance at promotion. The possibility to promote automatically was there on the last matchday of the season, a win against VfL Bochum was all they needed to leapfrog into 2nd. Union fought their way back from 0–2 to a 2–2, and nearly managed the victory at the last gasp. With the draw, Union finished with 57 points, and only missed 2nd place on goal differential. However, their amazing home form and ability to draw on the road was enough, as they secured a place in the Bundesliga Relegation playoffs, facing off in a two-leg series against VfB Stuttgart.

Relegation playoff (leg 1)
The first relegation playoff in club history would not be an easy task for the boys from Köpenick. The relegation playoffs heavily favor the team from the Bundesliga, with few teams managing to come out victorious from 2. Bundesliga. The first leg of the playoffs was played in Stuttgart at Mercedes-Benz Arena and couldn't have been harder on the Union fans emotionally. Stuttgart took a 1–0 lead just before halftime thanks to Christian Gentner, but 89 seconds later Suleiman Abdullahi managed to reply with an assist from Sebastian Andersson, and all was level at the break. The second half was opened quickly by VfB Stuttgart and started well for the home side as halftime substitute Mario Gomez found a goal for a quick 2–1 advantage. Union didn't give up despite the second setback, just as they hadn’t on the road all season. They came back strong, played out their chances and in the 68th minute Marvin Friedrich tied the game up at 2–2 from a corner kick by Christopher Trimmel. Friedrich had featured in every single game during the season for Union, but this was the first time finding the back of the net in any. After that goal it was Union who looked the more likely side to win, as Sebastian Andersson created two great chances that very nearly forced the improbable victory. Union fans we’re pleased with the 2–2 draw, since the away goals rule was in effect for these playoffs and Stuttgart had to come to Berlin and manage to find a win that had eluded virtually all visitors during the campaign.

Relegation playoff (leg 2)
Stadion An Der Alten Försterei was waiting for them, a place that Union had made a fortress during the 2018–19 season. Stuttgart would be forced to try and play attacking soccer, needing a 3 goal draw or victory to remain in Bundesliga. It was not an attractive game ripe with chances for either side, as the two teams battled in front of the crowd of over 22,000. Stuttgart thought they had the lead in the 9th minute when Dennis Aogo hit a free kick passed Gikiewicz. Somewhat controversially, it was promptly taken back by the video assistant referee, as Nicolás González had been found to have obstructed Gikiewicz's view from an offside position, thus making the goal unofficial. The rest of the game was nerve-wracking for both sides. The match stayed 0-0 into the 80th minute, a goal for either side would see their side into the Bundesliga almost certainly. As the game opened up, Abdullahi had two shots beat the VfB Stuttgart defense, only to be denied by the woodwork each time. Stuttgart came towards the goal of Union more and more, each time the stout Union defense and Gikiewicz were there to answer. Finally, Union had to survive the longest five minutes the fans of Stadion An der Alten Försterei had ever witnessed. When the final whistle came, Union Berlin has successfully promoted to the Bundesliga, for the first time in their long history. Meanwhile the 2–2 aggregate result after two draws saw VfB Stuttgart relegated on the away goals rule.

Aftermath
Only moments after the game ended, the field was flooded with Union fans in celebration. It was a success which few thought possible pre-season but had come to fruition none the less. The small club from the east side of Berlin with a cherished bond between the club and its fans were going to play in the Bundesliga for the very first time. The 56th-ever team to play in the Bundesliga since its founding, and the first-ever from East Berlin. The success in the promotion playoff cemented the 2018–19 season as the most famous ever in club history to this date, and simply a night no Union Berlin fan was ever going to forget. The following week Union paraded around the streets of Berlin and even down the Spree on a team boat, culminating in a party for players and fans alike at the Stadion An der Alten Försterei.

Players

Squad information

Transfers

Summer

In:

Out:

Winter

In:

Out:

Matches

Legend

Friendly matches

2. Bundesliga

League table

Results summary

Results by round

Matches

Relegation play-offs
First Leg

Second Leg

2–2 on aggregate. Union Berlin won on away goals and are promoted to the Bundesliga, while VfB Stuttgart are relegated to the 2. Bundesliga.

DFB-Pokal

Squad and statistics

! colspan="13" style="background:#DCDCDC; text-align:center" | Players transferred out during the season
|-

|}

References

1. FC Union Berlin seasons
Berlin, Union